Dragon Lake may refer to:
 Dragon Lake, British Columbia, an unincorporated community just south of Quesnel
 Dragon Lake Elementary School in the School District 28 Quesnel
 Drakolimni, the name of several alpine or sub-alpine lakes in the region of Epirus in northwestern Greece
 Lake Nacimiento, so called because of the dragon-like shape created by the positions of its arms
 a lake in the Longtan Park, China